Robert Selkirk Bothwell  (born 1944) is a Canadian professor of  Canadian history. Bothwell is considered to be the foremost scholar on Canadian Cold War participation, as well as a frequently published author.

Life and career
Bothwell was born in Ottawa, Ontario, on 17 August 1944. He completed his Bachelor of Arts degree at the University of Toronto and his Doctor of Philosophy degree at Harvard University. He was Director of the University of Toronto's international relations program at Trinity College,  where he is a fellow, and is a professor of Canadian political and diplomatic history.  Bothwell holds the May Gluskin Chair in Canadian History. His research interests include modern Canadian history and political, diplomatic, and military history. Bothwell is an expert on Canada–US relations.

Selected bibliography

 C.D. Howe: A Biography, by Robert Bothwell and William Kilbourn, Toronto, 1979, McClelland and Stewart, .
 Eldorado: Canada's National Uranium Company 1984
 A Short History of Ontario 1986
 Years of Victory 1987
 Nucleus: A History of Atomic Energy of Canada Limited, Toronto, 1988, University of Toronto Press, .
 Loring Christie 1988
 Laying the Foundations 1991
 Canada & the United States 1991
 Canada & Quebec 1995
 The Big Chill 1998
 The Penguin History of Canada 2006
 Alliance and Illusion: Canada and the World, 1945-1984 2007
 Your Country, My Country: A Unified History of the United States and Canada 2015

References

External links
 Robert Selkirk Bothwell from Canadian Encyclopedia
 Robert Bothwell archival papers are held at the University of Toronto Archives and Record Management Services

1944 births
Living people
20th-century Canadian historians
Canadian male non-fiction writers
Historians of Canada
Fellows of the Royal Society of Canada
Members of the Order of Canada
University of Toronto alumni
Harvard University alumni
Academic staff of the University of Toronto
21st-century Canadian historians